Guy Lenox Prendergast  (c. 8 July 1905 – 6 October 1986) was an English Saharan explorer, and British Army soldier in World War II. He was the commanding officer of the Long Range Desert Group from 1941 to 1943.

Early life

Guy Lenox Prendergast was one of a group of British Saharan explorers in the late 1920s and early 1930s, which included Ralph Alger Bagnold, Pat Clayton and Bill Kennedy Shaw, who had explored the desert before World War II and had gained much valuable experience in navigating its hostile terrain. Prendergast learnt to fly as part of the Western Arab Corps in Sudan in the 1930s.

Military career

After the outbreak of World War II, Prendergast received a commission with the British Army's Royal Tank Regiment. Together with his explorer associates he was involved in the formation of the Long Range Desert Group (L.R.D.G.) under the command of Bagnold. On 1 August 1941 Prendergast was promoted lieutenant colonel, and was appointed as the Commanding Officer of the L.R.D.G., which he led between November 1941 and October 1943.

It was thanks to Ultra and Prendergast and his L.R.D.G. that the Allies were able to hold on to Egypt in spite of heavy armoured reinforcements reaching Erwin Rommel’s Afrika Korps through Tunisia, including the much feared Panzer Mark IIIs and IVs. After viewing detailed intelligence reports prepared by an embedded L.R.D.G. detachment, Deputy Director of Middle East Intelligence, Major (later Brigadier) John Enoch Powell concluded that an outflanking movement through the Qattara Depression was highly unlikely, given the terrain and lack of supply infrastructure able to handle heavy matériel. 

After commanding the L.R.D.G., Prendergast went on to be Deputy Commander of Raiding Forces, and later Deputy Commander of the Special Air Service Brigade in 1944–1945, and subsequently Commander of the Free French SAS Regiments, with the rank of brigadier general. For his wartime service he was awarded the Distinguished Service Order in December 1942. and the Czechoslovakian Order of the White Lion III Class.

Death

He died on 6 October 1986 at the age of 81 years. His body was buried at Strathoich Cemetery, in Fort Augustus, Scotland.

Notes

References

 

1986 deaths
Companions of the Distinguished Service Order
Royal Tank Regiment officers
Special Air Service officers
1900s births
Long Range Desert Group personnel
British Army personnel of World War II
Military personnel from Berkshire